This is a list of nature centers and environmental education centers in the state of Iowa.

To use the sortable tables: click on the icons at the top of each column to sort that column in alphabetical order; click again for reverse alphabetical order.

References

 Iowa Conservation Education Coalition
 Iowa Association of Naturalists

External links
 Map of nature centers and environmental education centers in Iowa

 
Nature center
Iowa